This is a list of species in the botanical genus Passiflora. There are in excess of 550 species mostly occurring in the Neotropics, but with a few species in the Nearctic and some others in Asia and Australasia. The list is incomplete.

Species

A
 Passiflora acreana Mezzonato & Silveira
 ‡ Passiflora actinia Hook. – sea anemone passion flower 
 Passiflora acuminata DC.
 Passiflora adenophylla Mast.
 ‡ Passiflora adenopoda DC.
 Passiflora adulterina L.fil.
 Passiflora affinis Engelm.
 Passiflora aimae Annonay & Feuillet
 ‡ Passiflora alata Curtis – winged-stem passion flower, ouvaca
 Passiflora alliacea Barb. Rodr.
 Passiflora allantophylla Mast. ex Donn.Sm.
 Passiflora allardii Lynch
 Passiflora alnifolia Kunth
 ¤ Passiflora altebilobata Hemsl.
 Passiflora amabilis Hook.
 Passiflora amalocarpa Barb.Rodr.
 Passiflora amazonica L.K.Escobar
 ‡ Passiflora ambigua Hemsl. ex Hook.f.
 Passiflora amethystina J.C.Mikan
 Passiflora amicorum Wurdack
 Passiflora amoena L.K.Escobar
 ‡ Passiflora ampullacea Harms
 Passiflora anadenia Urb.
 Passiflora anastomosans (Lamb. ex DC.) Kilip
 Passiflora andersonii DC.
 Passiflora andina (H.Karst.) Killip
 Passiflora andreana Mast.
 Passiflora anfracta Mast. & André
 Passiflora angusta Feuillet & J.M.MacDougal
 ‡ Passiflora antioquiensis H.Karst
 Passiflora apetala Killip
 Passiflora apoda Harms
 Passiflora araguensis L.K.Escobar
 Passiflora araujoi Sacco
 Passiflora arbelaezii L.Uribe
 Passiflora arborea Spreng.
 ‡ Passiflora arida (Mast. & Rose) Killip
 Passiflora aristulata Mast.
 Passiflora arizonica (Killip) D.H.Goldman
 Passiflora ascidia Feuillet
 ¤ Passiflora aurantia G.Forst.
 Passiflora auriculata Kunth

B
 Passiflora bacabensis Mezzonato, Silva & Oliveira
 Passiflora bahamensis Britton
 Passiflora bahiensis Klotzsch
 Passiflora balbis Feuillet
 Passiflora barclayi (Seem.) Mast.
 Passiflora baueri (Lindl.) Mast
 Passiflora bauhiniifolia Kunth
 Passiflora bernaccii Mezzonato
 Passiflora berteroana Balb. ex DC.
 Passiflora bicornis Mill.
 Passiflora bicrura Urb.
 Passiflora bicuspidata (H.Karst.) Mast.
 Passiflora biflora Lam. – two-flowered passion flower
 Passiflora bilobata Juss.
 Passiflora boenderi J.M.MacDougal
 Passiflora bogotensis Benth
 Passiflora boticarioana Cervi
 Passiflora brachyantha L.K.Escobar
 Passiflora bracteosa Planch. and Linden ex Triana and Planch
 Passiflora brevifila Killip
 Passiflora bryonioides Kunth – cupped passion flower
 Passiflora bucaramangensis Killip
 Passiflora buchtienii Killip

C
 Passiflora cacao 
 ‡ Passiflora caerulea L. – blue passion flower, common passion flower
 Passiflora campanulata Mast.
 Pasaiflora candida (Poepp. & Endl.) Mast.
 Passiflora candollei Triana and Planch.
 Passiflora canescens Killip
 Passiflora capparidifolia Killip
 Passiflora capsularis L. – red granadilla
 Passiflora cardonae Killip
 Passiflora castellanosii Sacco
 Passiflora catharinensis Sacco
 Passiflora cauliflora Harms
 Passiflora cerasina Annonay & Feuillet
 Passiflora ceratocarpa F. Silveira
 Passiflora cervii M.L. Milward de Azevedo
 Passiflora chaparensis R. Vásquez
 Passiflora chelidonea Mast.
 Passiflora chlorina L.K.Escobar
 Passiflora chocoensis G. Gerlach & Ulmer
 Passiflora choconiana S. Watson
 Passiflora chrysophylla Chodat
 Passiflora chrysosepala Schwerdtf.
 Passiflora ciliata Aiton – fringed passionflower
 Passiflora cincinnata Mast.
 ¤ Passiflora cinnabarina Lindl.
 Passiflora cirrhiflora A.Juss.
 Passiflora cirrhipes Killip
 Passiflora cissampeloides J.M.MacDougal
 Passiflora citrifolia Salisb.
 Passiflora citrina J.M.MacDougal – lemon-yellow passion flower
 Passiflora clathrata Mast.
 Passiflora clypeophylla Mast.
 Passiflora coactilis Killip
 Passiflora cobanensis Killip
 ‡ Passiflora coccinea Aubl. – Red granadilla
 ¤ Passiflora cochinchinensis Spreng.
 Passiflora cocuyensis M. Molinari
 Passiflora colimensis Mast. & Rose ex Rose
 Passiflora colinvauxii Wiggins
 Passiflora colombiana L.K. Escobar
 Pasiflora compar Feuillet
 Passiflora complanata J.M.MacDougal in edit
 Passiflora contracta Vitta
 Passiflora conzattiana Killip
 Passiflora cookii Killip
 Passiflora cordistipula Cervi
 Passiflora coriacea Juss.
 Passiflora cornuta Mast.
 Passiflora costaricensis Killip
 Passiflora costata Mast.
 Passiflora crassifolia Killip
 Passiflora cremastantha Harms
 Passiflora crenata Feuillet & Cremera
 Passiflora crispolanata L. Uribe
 Passiflora cryptopetala Hoehne
 Passiflora cuatrecasasii Killip
 Passiflora cubensis Urb.
 ‡ Passiflora cumbalensis (H.Karst.) Harms
 Passiflora cuneata Willd.
 ¤ Passiflora cupiformis Mast.
 Passiflora cupraea L.
 Passiflora cuspidifolia Harms
 Passiflora cuzcoensis Killip
 Passiflora cyanea Mast.
D
 Passiflora dalechampioides Killip
 Passiflora dasyadenia Urb.
 Passiflora dawei Killip
 Passiflora deficiens Mast.
 Passiflora deidamioides Harms
 Passiflora deltoifolia Holm-Niels. & J.E.Lawesson
 Passiflora dictamo DC.
 Passiflora dioscoreifolia Killip
 Passiflora discophora P.Jørg. & J.E.Lawesson
 Passiflora dispar Killip
 Passiflora dolichocarpa Killip
E
 ¤ Passiflora eberhardtii Gagnep.
 Passiflora edmundoi Sacco
 † Passiflora edulis Sims – passion fruit, maracujá, parcha (Puerto Rico), wal dodam (Sinhalese), yellow granadilla, likkoi, marucuyá
 Passiflora eggersii Harms
 Passiflora eglandulosa J.M.MacDougal
 Passiflora eichleriana Mast.
 Passiflora ekmanii Killip & Urb.
 Passiflora elegans Mast.
 Passiflora elliptica Gardner
 Passiflora emarginata Bonpl.
 Passiflora engleriana Harms
 Passiflora ernestii Harms
 Passiflora erythrophylla Mast.
 Passiflora escobariana J.M.MacDougal
 Passiflora eueidipabulum S. Knapp & Mallet
 Passiflora exoperculata Mast.
 Passiflora exsudans Zucc.
 Passiflor exura Feuillet
F
 Passiflora fanchonae Feuillet
 Passiflora farneyi Pessoa & Cervi
 Passiflora faroana Harms
 Passiflora fernandezii L.K. Escobar
 Passiflora ferruginea Mast.
 Passiflora filamentosa Cav.
 Passiflora filipes Benth
 Passiflora fimbriatistipula Harma
 Passiflora flexipes Triana and Planch.
 ‡ Passiflora foetida L. – stinking passion flower, foetid passion flower, wild maracujá, running pop
 Passiflora frutescens Ruiz & Pav. ex Killip
 Passiflora fruticosa Killip
 Passiflora fuchsiiflora Hemsl.
G
 Passiflora galbana Masters
 Passiflora gardneri Masters
 Passiflora gibertii N. E. Br.
 Passiflora glandulosa Cav.
 Passiflora goniosperma Killip
 Passiflora gracillima Killip
 Passiflora guatemalensis S. Wats.
H
 Passiflora haematostigma Mast.
 Passiflora hahnii Mast.
 Passiflora harlingii Holm-Niels.
 ¤ Passiflora henryii Hemsl.
 ‡¤ Passiflora herbertiana Ker Gawl. – native passionfruit
 Passiflora hirtiflora P.Jørg. & Holm-Niels.
 ¤ Passiflora hollrungii K.Schum.
 Passiflora holosericea L.
 Passiflora hyacinthiflora Planch. & Linden
I
 ‡ Passiflora incarnata L. – maypop, purple passion flower, ocoee (Cherokee)
 Passiflora indecora Kunth
 Passiflora insignis Hook.
 Passiflora ita Mezzonato, R. S. Ribeiro & Gonella

J
 Passiflora jamesonii L.H.Bailey
 Passiflora jatunsachensis M.Schwerdtfeger
 ¤ Passiflora jiangfengensis S.M.Hwang and Q.Huang
 Passiflora jorgeana Mezzonato
 Passiflora jorullensis Kunth.
 ¤ Passiflora jugorum W.W.Sm.
 Passiflora julianaK
 Passiflora kermesina Link & Otto
 ¤ Passiflora kuranda Krosnick
 ¤ Passiflora kwangtungensis Merr.
L
 Passiflora lanata Poir.
 Passiflora lancifolia Passiflora lauana J.M.MacDougal
 † Passiflora laurifolia L. – water lemon, Jamaican honeysuckle
 ¤ Passiflora leschenaultii DC.
 † Passiflora ligularis A.Juss. – sweet granadilla
 Passiflora linda Panero
 Passiflora lindeniana Planch. ex Triana & Planch.
 Passiflora loefgrenii Vitta
 Passiflora lorenziana Mezzonato & Bernacci
 Passiflora loxensis Killip & Cuatrec.
 Passiflora lutea L. – yellow passion flower
 Passiflora luzmarina P.Jørg.

M
 Passiflora macdougaliana S.Knapp & J.Mallet
 Passiflora macfadyenii Passiflora macrophylla Spruce ex Mast. – tree passion flower
 Passiflora macvaughiana † Passiflora maliformis L. – sweet calabash
 Passiflora manicata (Juss.) Pers.
 Passiflora membranacea Benth.
 Passiflora menispermifolia Kunth
 Passiflora microstipula L.E.Gilbert & J.M.MacDougal
 Passiflora miersii Mast.
 Passiflora miniata Vanderpl.
 Passiflora misera Kunth
 ‡ Passiflora mixta L.f.
 ¤ Passiflora moluccana Reinw. ex Blume
 Passiflora monadelpha P.Jørg. & Holm-Niels.
 Passiflora montana 
 Passiflora morifolia Mast. – blue sweet calabash, woodland passion flower
 Passiflora mucronata Lam.
 Passiflora multiflora L.– whiteflower passionflower
 Passiflora murucuja L.
N
 ¤ Passiflora napalensis Wall.
 ‡ Passiflora nitida Kunth.– bell apple
O
 Passiflora obtusifolia Passiflora odontophylla Harms ex Glaz.
 Passiflora oerstedii Mast.
 Passiflora organensis Gardner
 Passiflora ovalis Vell.
P
 Passiflora palenquensis Holm-Nielsen & Lawesson
 Passiflora pallens Poepp. ex Masters– pineland passionflower
 Passiflora pallida ¤ Passiflora papilio H.L.Li
 Passiflora pardifolia Vanderpl.
 Passiflora pectinata Griseb.
 Passiflora penduliflora Bert. ex DC.
 ¤ Passiflora perakensis Hallier f.
 ‡ Passiflora pergrandis Holm-Nielsen & Lawesson
 Passiflora picturata Ker Gawl.
 Passiflora pilosa Ruiz & Pavon ex DC.
 Passiflora pinnatistipula Cav.
 Passiflora pittieri Mast.
 Passiflora platyloba Killip
 Passiflora pohlii Mast.
 Passiflora popenovii Killip
 Passiflora punctata L.
 Passiflora purii Mezzonato, Lima & A.P.Gelli
 Passiflora pusilla J.M.MacDougal
 Passiflora pyrrhantha Harms

Q
 Passiflora quadrangularis L. – giant granadilla, giant tumbo, badea Passiflora quetzal J.M.MacDougal

R
 Passiflora racemosa Brot.
 Passiflora reflexiflora Cav.
 Passiflora retipetala Mast.
 Passiflora rhamnifolia Mast.
 Passiflora roseorum Killip
 Passiflora rubra L.
 Passiflora rupestris Bernacci, Mezzonato & Salimena

S
 Passiflora sanctae-barbarae Holm-Nielsen & Jørgensen
 Passiflora sanguinolenta Mast.
 ‡ Passiflora schlimiana Triana & Planch.
 ‡ Passiflora seemannii Griseb.
 Passiflora sexocellata Passiflora sexflora Juss. – goatsfoot
 Passiflora serratifolia L.
 ‡ Passiflora serratodigitata L.
 Passiflora setacea DC.
 ¤ Passiflora siamica Craib
 Passiflora sicyoides Schlecht. & Cham.
 Passiflora smilacifolia J.M.MacDougal
 Passiflora sodiroi Harms
 Passiflora speciosa Gardner
 Passiflora sprucei Mast.
 Passiflora suberosa L. – corky-stemmed passion flower
 Passiflora subpeltata Ortega – white passion flower
 Passiflora subpurpurea Jørgensen & Holm-Nielsen
 ¤ Passiflora sumatrana Blume
T
 † Passiflora tarminiana Coppens & V.Barney – banana passion flower, curuba India, curuba ecuatoriana, banana pōka (Hawaiʻi), curuba quiteña (Colombia), tacso amarillo (Ecuador)
 Passiflora telesiphe Knapp & Mallet
 ¤ Passiflora tetrandra Banks & Sol. ex DC
 Passiflora tenuifila Killip
 Passiflora tenuiloba Passiflora tica Gómez-Laurito & L.D.Gómez
 ¤ Passiflora tonkinensis W.J.de Wilde
 Passiflora trialata Feuillet & J.M.MacDougal
 Passiflora tricuspis Mast.
 Passiflora tridactylites Passiflora trifasciata Lem.
 Passiflora trinervia (Juss.) Poir
 Passiflora trinifolia Passiflora tripartita (Juss.) Poir
 † Passiflora tripartita var. mollissima Passiflora trisecta Mast.
 Passiflora trochlearis Jørgensen
 Passiflora tulae Urb.

U
 Passiflora ulmeri Schwerdtfeger
 Passiflora umbilicata (Griseb.) Harms
 Passiflora urbaniana Killip
V
 Passiflora vellozii Gardner
 Passiflora viridescens L.K. Escobar
 Passiflora viridiflora † Passiflora vitifolia Kunth
W
 Passiflora watsoniana Mast.
 Passiflora weberbaueri Harms
 Passiflora weigendii Ulmer & Schwerdtf.
 Passiflora wilsonii Hemsl.
X
 Passiflora xiikzodz ¤ Passiflora xishuangbannaensis Krosnick
Y
 Passiflora yucatanensis Killip
Z
 Passiflora zamorana Killip

Horticultural hybrids

 Passiflora ×allardii Lynch (P. caerulea × quadrangularis)
 Passiflora ×belotii Pépin (P. alata × caerulea)
 Passiflora ×colvillii Sweet (P. incarnata × caerulea)
 Passiflora ×decaisneana G.Nicholson (P. alata × quadrangularis)
 Passiflora ×exoniensis Mast. (P. antioquiensis × tripartita var. mollissima)
 Passiflora ×kewensis Nicholson (P. caerulea × kermesina)
 Passiflora ×lawsoniana Mast. (P. alata × racemosa)
 Passiflora ×loudonii Loudon (P. racemosa × kermesina)
 Passiflora ×smythiana Mast. (P. manicata × tripartita var. mollissima)
 Passiflora ×violacea Loisel. (P. racemosa × caerulea'')

Footnotes
† - principal culinary species fide Ulmer and MacDougall
‡ - other species with edible fruits fide Ulmer and MacDougall
¤ - Old World species fide Krosnick

External links
 Feuillet & MacDougal, Checklist of Recognized Species Names of Passion Flowers, Passiflora 12(2): 41-43 (2002)

References

Passiflora